This is a list of the alumni of the Accademia di Brera, also known as the Accademia di Belle Arti di Brera or Brera Academy, the state art school of the city of Milan, in Lombardy, Italy.

 Felice Abrami, artist
 Tilake Abeysinghe, painter, sculptor
 Angiolo Achini, artist
 Valerio Adami, artist
 Luigi Ademollo, artist
 Carlo Paolo Agazzi, artist
 Agostino Aglio, artist
 Achille Alberti, artist
 Martina Amati, filmmaker 
 Giuseppe Amisani, artist
 Aldo Andreani, architect, artist
 Attilio Andreoli, artist
 Andrea Appiani, artist
 Carlo Arienti, artist
 Giulio Cesare Arrivabene
 Enrico Baj, artist
 Carlo Balestrini
 Contardo Barbieri
 Donato Barcaglia
 Sara Battaglia, fashion designer
 Leonardo Bazzaro
 Vanessa Beecroft, artist
 Giovanni Bellati
 Giorgio Belloni
 Luca Beltrami, architect, art historian and restorer
 Daniela Benedini
 Giacomo Benevelli, sculptor, artist
 Riccardo Beretta
 Arduino Berlam
 Ruggero Berlam
 Giuseppe Bertini
 Cesare Bertolotti
 Mosè Bianchi, artist
 Remo Bianco
 Mario Biazzi
 Emilio Bisi
 Luigi Bisi
 Leonardo Bistolfi
 Guido Boggiani, ethnographer, photographer, painter
 Aroldo Bonzagni
 Pompeo Borra, artist
 Timo Bortolotti
 Giuseppe Bossi, artist, draftsman, poet and writer
 Enrico Braga
 Fernando Brambila
 Ermocrate Bucchi
 Anselmo Bucci
 Carlo Bugatti
 Leopoldo Burlando
 Amerino Cagnoni
 Stefano Cagol, artist
 Sergio Calatroni, artist
 Ercole Calvi
 Innocente Cantinotti
 Filippo Carcano
 Aldo Carpi, artist and writer
 Carlo Carrà, artist
 Raffaele Casnédi, artist
 Achille Cattaneo
 Vincent Cavallaro
 Loris Cecchini, artist
 Riccardo Cessi, painter
 James Coleman, artist
 Augusto Colombo
 Joe Cesare Colombo
 Virginio Colombo
 Mauro Conconi
 Cherubino Cornienti, painter
 Michele Cusa
 Guido Daniele
 Sebastiano De Albertis
 Francesco De Lorenzi
 Francesco De Rocchi
 Cristina Donà
 Emilio Giuseppe Dossena, painter
 Leonardo Dudreville
 Gian Maurizio Fercioni, scenographer and costume designer
 Francesco Filippini
 Dario Fo, actor, writer
 Alessandro Focosi
 Lucio Fontana, artist
 Achille Formis
 Piero Fornasetti
 Donato Frisia
 Michelangelo Fumagalli
 Achille Funi, artist
 Giuseppe Gabellone, artist
 Silvio Gazzaniga, artist
 Tommaso Geraci
 Eugenio Gignous
 Lorenzo Gignous
 Achille Glisenti
 Zvi Goldstein
 Pietro Gualdi
 Domenico Induno
 Gerolamo Induno
 Angelo Inganni
 Samuel Jesi
 Carlo Jotti
 Vénera Kastrati, artist
 Emilio Lazzari
 Trento Longaretti
 Emilio Longoni, artist
 Serafino Macchiati
 Emilio Magistretti, artist
 Pietro Magni, artist
 Miltos Manetas, artist
 Pompeo Marchesi
 Carlo Martini, artist
 Arrigo Renato Marzola
 Pietro Marzorati
 Denis Masi, artist and academic
 Giuseppe Mazza, artist
 Marco Mazzoni
 Pietro Michis
 Lorenzo Milani
 Giusseppe Modorati
 Federico Moja
 Giuseppe Molteni
 Battista Mombrini
 Giuseppe Montanari
 Carlo Montuori
 Angelo Morbelli
 Giuseppe Novello, cartoonist
 Eleuterio Pagliano
 Mario Palanti
 Antonio Pasinetti
 Achille Peretti, artist
 Domenico Pesenti
 Giovanni Pessina
 Paola Pivi, artist
 Carlo Pizzi
 Lodovico Pogliaghi
 Ambrogio Preda
 Luigi Premazzi
 Gaetano Previati
 Constantino Prinetti
 Attilio Pusterla
 Federico Quarenghi
 Camillo Rapetti
 Enrico Ravetta
 Angelo Ribossi
 Virgilio Ripari
 Remo Rossi
 Medardo Rosso, artist
 Abbondio Sangiorgio
 Rinaldo Saporiti
 Mario Sarto, artist
 Luigi Secchi
 Giovanni Segantini, artist
 Jeffrey Shaw
 Roberta Silva, artist
 Antonio Soldini
 Giuseppe Solenghi
 Giuseppe Sommaruga
 Giovanni Sottocornola
 Giovanni Spertini
 Anita Spinelli
 Eugenio Spreafico
 Giovanni Strazza
 Cesare Tallone
 Parviz Tanavoli
 Arturo Tosi
 Angelo Trezzini
 Ezechiele Trombetta
 Grazia Varisco, artist
 Spartaco Vela
 Baldassare Verazzi, artist
 Adolfo Feragutti Visconti
 Ornela Vorpsi
 Bettina Werner, artist
 Giuseppe Zannoni

References

Brera Academy